is a Japanese footballer who plays for Vitória Guimarães in the Primeira Liga.

Club career 
Ogawa joined FC Tokyo in 2016 and made his league debut against Vegalta Sendai on 6 March 2016.

International career 
He made his debut for Japan national football team on 25 March 2021 in a friendly against South Korea.

Club career statistics 
Updated to 26 June 2022.

Reserves performance

Last Updated: 3 November 2019

Honours

Club
FC Tokyo
J.League Cup: 2020

References

External links

Profile at FC Tokyo

1996 births
Living people
Association football people from Tokyo
Japanese footballers
Japan international footballers
J1 League players
J3 League players
FC Tokyo players
FC Tokyo U-23 players
Vitória S.C. players
Primeira Liga players
J.League U-22 Selection players
Association football defenders

Japanese expatriate sportspeople in Portugal